Jean-Joseph Henri "Bobby" Monnard (February 11, 1901 – February 3, 1973) was a French ice hockey player who competed in the 1924 Winter Olympics.

In 1924, he participated with the French ice hockey team in the Olympic tournament.

External links
list of French ice hockey players
Jean-Joseph Monnard's profile at Sports Reference.com

1901 births
1973 deaths
Ice hockey players at the 1924 Winter Olympics
Olympic ice hockey players of France